La Torre de Fontaubella is a municipality in the comarca of the Priorat in Catalonia, Spain. It is situated at the southeastern end of the comarca.

Demography

References

 Panareda Clopés, Josep Maria; Rios Calvet, Jaume; Rabella Vives, Josep Maria (1989). Guia de Catalunya, Barcelona: Caixa de Catalunya.  (Spanish).  (Catalan).

External links

 
 Government data pages 

Municipalities in Priorat
Populated places in Priorat